Krishna Prasad Dahal is a Nepalese Politician and serving as the Member Of House Of Representatives (Nepal) elected from Makwanpur-1, Province No. 3. He is member of the Nepal Communist Party.

References

Living people
Nepal MPs 2017–2022
Nepal Communist Party (NCP) politicians
Nepal MPs 1991–1994
Communist Party of Nepal (Unified Marxist–Leninist) politicians
1963 births